Spüligbach is a river of Lower Saxony, Germany.

The Spüligbach springs near Heinade. It is a left tributary of the Ilme, near Dassel.

See also
List of rivers of Lower Saxony

References

Rivers of Lower Saxony
Rivers of Germany